Edward Caldwell Rye (1832–1885) was an English entomologist.

Life
The eldest son of Edward Rye, a London solicitor with background in Norfolk, he was born at Golden Square on 10 April 1832; Maria Rye was his sister and Walter Rye his brother. He was educated at King's College School, then, rather than going into his father's business, he concentrated on natural history, especially entomology.

Rye became librarian of the Royal Geographical Society and was a constant contributor to The Field. For some years he was honorary secretary of the geographical section of the British Association. He died of smallpox on 7 February 1885, aged 52.

Works

Rye collected English coleoptera, to knowledge of which he added many species. He was the author of British Beetles (1866), was co-editor of the Entomologists' Monthly Magazine, and for several years was editor of the Zoological Record.

Family
Rye married in 1867 Isabella Sophia Waterhouse, daughter of the naturalist George Robert Waterhouse. They had four children.

Notes

External links
Attribution

1832 births
1885 deaths
English entomologists
English librarians
English magazine editors